Ryan Van Natten (born November 11, 1987) is an American-born ice dancer who currently competes for Mexico with partner Corenne Bruhns. Together, they are the 2012 Mexican national champions. 

Van Natten is a member of the Lumbee Native American tribe by his mother Becky (Lowery) Van Natten.  His mother is a registered nurse while his father, Peter Van Natten, is a Chief Petty Officer (United States) in the US Coast Guard.

Programs 
(with Bruhns)

Competitive highlights

With Bruhns for Mexico

With Carey for the United States

References

External links 

 
 IDC's Profile Page

1987 births
Living people
21st-century American dancers
21st-century Mexican dancers
21st-century Native Americans
American expatriate sportspeople in Mexico
Lumbee people
Mexican ice dancers